Abdulaziz Al Sulaiti (born June 11, 1988) is a Qatari footballer who is an attacking midfielder . He made his debut the Qatar national football team during the 9th International Friendship Tournament held in December 2009.

Al Sulaiti played for Qatar at the 2005 FIFA U-17 World Championship in Peru.

Club career statistics
Statistics accurate as of 21 August 2011

1Includes Emir of Qatar Cup.
2Includes Sheikh Jassem Cup.
3Includes AFC Champions League.

International goals
Scores and results list Qatar's goal tally first.

References

External links
FIFA.com profile
Goalzz.com profile
QSL.com.qa profile

1988 births
Living people
Qatari footballers
Al-Arabi SC (Qatar) players
Qatar international footballers
2011 AFC Asian Cup players
Qatar Stars League players
Al Sadd SC players
El Jaish SC players
Al Ahli SC (Doha) players
Association football midfielders